Hopeton may refer to:
Hopeton, California
Hopeton, Virginia
Hopeton Earthworks, Hopewell culture mounds and earthworks located about a mile east of the Mound City group on a terrace of the Scioto River
Hopeton Lewis (1947–2014), Jamaican singer

See also
 Hopetoun (disambiguation)
 Hopetown (disambiguation)